Antonio Grillo may refer to:
Antonio Grillo (designer, born 1971) Italian Designer, Adjunct Professor for Inclusive Design at Laura Magistrale Politecnico di Milano - School of Design, Advisory Board Member of PSSD-Product Service System Design.
Antonio Grillo (footballer, born 1986) Italian football defender born in 1986
Antonio Grillo (footballer, born 1991) Italian football midfielder born in 1991